Aranama (Araname), also known as Tamique, is an extinct unclassified language of Texas, USA. It was spoken by the Aranama and Tamique peoples at the Franciscan mission of Espíritu Santo de Zúñiga. It is only known from a two-word phrase from a non-native speaker: himiána tsáyi 'give me water!'. Variations on the name are Taranames, Jaranames ~ Xaranames ~ Charinames, Chaimamé, Hanáma ~ Hanáme.

Known words
In 1884, Albert Gatschet recorded one word and a two-word phrase from "Old Simon," a Tonkawa man who also served as an informant for the Karankawa language, of which a short vocabulary was recorded. According to Old Simon, the words were from a language that he referred to as "Hanáma" (or "Háname"):

himiyána ‘water’
Himiána tsýi! ‘Give me water!’

References

Indigenous languages of Texas
Extinct languages of North America
Indigenous languages of North America
Unclassified languages of North America